The Plaza Bolivar is also known as the Plaza of Congress or Plaza of the Inquisition as it is surrounded by the Legislative Palace which is the seat of the Congress of Peru, and the site of the former Tribunal of the Inquisition. It is located in the Barrios Altos neighborhood of the Historic Center of Lima, the capital of Peru. It is located at the second block of Abancay avenue, three blocks east of the Plaza Mayor of Lima. 

Gatherings and parades are held at the plaza during national holidays due to Simon Bolivar, being the liberator of five South American countries, being the plaza's namesake.

Gallery

References

Bolivar